Miguel Itzigsohn (1908–1978) was an Argentine astronomer and observer of comets, credited by the Minor Planet Center with the discovery of 15 asteroids between 1948 and 1954. The outer main-belt asteroid 1596 Itzigsohn, which he discovered himself, was named in his memory on 1 August 1980.

Itzigsohn was a professor of spherical and practical astronomy. From 1955 to 1972, he was director of the extrameridian astronomy department at the La Plata Astronomical Observatory, specializing in astrometry and celestial mechanics. He was responsible for the surge in observational and computational activity in studies of minor planets in Argentina following World War II.

References

External links 
 Lista de cientificos (in Spanish)

20th-century Argentine astronomers
Argentine Jews
Discoverers of asteroids

Place of birth missing
1908 births
1978 deaths